This is a list of the extant roses of the Spanish breeder Pedro Dot (1885–1976). ‘HT’ means ‘hybrid tea.’

Sortable list of available Pedro Dot roses

References 

  
 "Pedro Dot" in 
 Help Me Find Roses entry for Dot, Pedro
 Amics de les Roses de Sant Feliu de Llobregat  

Lists of cultivars